Onofrio is an Italian surname derived from Onuphrius. Notable people with the surname include:

Vincent D'Onofrio
Al Onofrio
Beverly Donofrio
Elizabeth D'Onofrio
Francesco Onofrio Manfredini
Marco Onofrio

See also
Sant'Onofrio (disambiguation)
San Onofre (disambiguation)

Italian-language surnames